Princess Helena Tekla Lubomirska née Ossolińska (died 1687) was a Polish noblewoman, wife of Aleksander Michał Lubomirski since 1637.

Ossolinska, Helena Tekla
Ossolinska, Helena Tekla
Ossoliński family